The 2011 Tampa Mayoral Election took place in March 2011, in the city of Tampa, Florida. Incumbent Mayor Pam Iorio was prevented from seeking a third term due to term limits, creating an open seat. Candidates Rose Ferlita and Bob Buckhorn placed first and second, respectively, in the mayoral election held on March 1, 2011. Because neither candidate received a majority of the vote, a runoff took place on March 22, 2011, which Buckhorn won.

Results

First round

Runoff

References

Government of Tampa, Florida
Mayoral elections in Tampa, Florida
Tampa
2011 Florida elections
21st century in Tampa, Florida
March 2011 events in the United States